Spencer Eye Hospital is an eye hospital located in Karachi, Pakistan. It is the oldest specialized hospital of Pakistan, having been established in 1938 (or 1940) and is run by the Karachi Metropolitan Corporation.

History
The hospital was established in 1938 by Dr K.N. Spencer, a Parsi doctor.

In 1940, the hospital began its service.

In 2019, the hospital resumed cornea transplantation after a gap of 12 years.

References

Hospitals in Karachi
Hospitals established in 1938
1930s establishments in British India